The diving competitions at the 2012 Olympic Games in London took place from 29 July to 11 August at the Aquatics Centre within the Olympic Park. It was one of four aquatic sports at the Games, along with swimming, water polo and synchronised swimming.

The 2012 Games featured competitions in eight events (men and women events each of): 3m springboard, synchronised 3m springboard, 10m platform, and synchronised 10m platform.

The diving featured 136 athletes representing 25 countries. All divers must be at least 14 years old on or by 31 December 2012.

China was the most successful nation, topping the medal table with six golds and ten in total.

Qualification

A nation could have no more than 16 divers qualify (up to eight males and eight females) and could enter up to two divers in individual events and one pair in synchronised events.

For the individual diving events, qualifiers were:
the top 12 finishers in each event from the 2011 World Championships,
the five continental champions in each event, and 
up to 18 semi-finalists from the 2012 Diving World Cup.

For the synchronised events (pairs), qualifiers were:
the top three finishers in each event from the 2011 World Championships, 
the top four from in each event the 2012 World Cup, and 
the host nation (Great Britain).

Note: Qualifying spots go to the nation – they are not tied to the individual diver who achieved the place/finish at the qualifying event. However, an individual diver may only qualify one spot for their nation.

Participating nations
Twenty-five nations competed in diving at the 2012 Olympics:

Schedule

Medalists

Medal table

Men

Women

References

External links 

 
 
 

 
2012 Summer Olympics events
2012
2012 in diving
Diving competitions in the United Kingdom